African Romance or African Latin is an extinct Romance language that was spoken in the various provinces of Roman Africa by the Roman Africans under the later Roman Empire and its various post-Roman successor states in the region, including the Vandal Kingdom, the Byzantine-administered Exarchate of Africa and the Berber Mauro-Roman Kingdom.  African Romance is poorly attested as it was mainly a spoken, vernacular language. There is little doubt, however, that by the early 3rd century AD, some native provincial variety of Latin was fully established in Africa.

After the conquest of North Africa by the Umayyad Caliphate in 709 AD, this language survived through to the 12th century in various places along the North African coast and the immediate littoral, with evidence that it may have persisted up to the 14th century, and possibly even the 15th century, or later in certain areas of the interior.

Background 

The Roman province of Africa was organized in 146 BC following the defeat of Carthage in the Third Punic War. The city of Carthage, destroyed following the war, was rebuilt during the dictatorship of Julius Caesar as a Roman colony, and by the 1st century, it had grown to be the fourth largest city of the empire, with a population in excess of 100,000 people. The Fossa regia  was an important boundary in North Africa, originally separating the Roman occupied Carthaginian territory from Numidia, and may have served as a cultural boundary indicating Romanization.

In the time of the Roman Empire, the province had become populous and prosperous and Carthage was the second-largest Latin-speaking city in the Empire. Latin was, however, largely an urban and coastal speech. Carthaginian Punic continued to be spoken in inland and rural areas as late as the mid-5th century, but also in the cities. It is probable that Berber languages were spoken in some areas as well.

Funerary stelae chronicle the Romanization of art and religion in North Africa. Notable differences, however, existed in the penetration and survival of the Latin, Punic and Berber languages. These indicated regional differences: Neo-Punic had a revival in Tripolitania, around Hippo Regius there is a cluster of Libyan inscriptions, while in the mountainous regions of Kabylie and Aures, Latin was scarcer, though not absent.

Africa was occupied by the Germanic Vandal tribe for over a century, between 429 and 534 AD, when the province was reconquered by the Byzantine Emperor Justinian I. The changes that occurred in spoken Latin during that time are unknown. Literary Latin, however, was maintained at a high standard, as seen in the Latin poetry of the African writer Corippus. The area around Carthage remained fully Latin-speaking until the arrival of the Arabs.

Origins and development

Like all Romance languages, African Romance descended from Vulgar Latin, the non-standard (in contrast to Classical Latin) form of the Latin language, which was spoken by soldiers and merchants throughout the Roman Empire. With the expansion of the empire, Vulgar Latin came to be spoken by inhabitants of the various Roman-controlled territories in North Africa. Latin and its descendants were spoken in the Province of Africa following the Punic Wars, when the Romans conquered the territory. Spoken Latin, and Latin inscriptions developed while Punic was still being used. Bilingual inscriptions were engraved, some of which reflect the introduction of Roman institutions into Africa, using new Punic expressions.

Latin, and then some Romance variant of it, was spoken by generations of speakers, for about fifteen centuries. This was demonstrated by African-born speakers of African Romance who continued to create Latin inscriptions until the first half of the 11th century. Evidence for a spoken Romance variety which developed locally out of Latin persisted in rural areas of Tunisia – possibly as late as the last two decades of the 15th century in some sources.

By the late 19th century and early 20th century, the possible existence of African Latin was controversial, with debates on the existence of Africitas as a putative African dialect of Latin. In 1882, the German scholar  used unconvincing material to adduce features particular to Latin in Africa. This unconvincing evidence was attacked by Wilhelm Kroll in 1897, and again by Madeline D. Brock in 1911. Brock went so far as to assert that "African Latin was free from provincialism", and that African Latin was "the Latin of an epoch rather than that of a country". This view shifted in recent decades, with modern philologists going so far as to say that African Latin "was not free from provincialism" and that, given the remoteness of parts of Africa, there were "probably a plurality of varieties of Latin, rather than a single African Latin". Other researchers believe that features peculiar to African Latin existed, but are "not to be found where Sittl looked for it".
 
While as a language African Romance is extinct, there is some evidence of regional varieties in African Latin that helps reconstruct some of its features. Some historical evidence on the phonetic and lexical features of the Afri were already observed in ancient times. Pliny observes how walls in Africa and Spain are called , or "framed walls, because they are made by packing in a frame enclosed between two boards, one on each side". Nonius Marcellus, a Roman grammarian, provides further, if uncertain, evidence regarding vocabulary and possible "Africanisms". In the Historia Augusta, the North African Roman Emperor Septimius Severus is said to have retained an African accent until old age. More recent analysis focuses on a body of literary texts, being literary pieces written by African and non-African writers. These show the existence of an African pronunciation of Latin, then moving on to a further study of lexical material drawn from sub-literary sources, such as practical texts and ostraca, from multiple African communities, that is military writers, landholders and doctors.

The Romance philologist James Noel Adams lists a number of possible Africanisms found in this wider Latin literary corpus. Only two refer to constructions found in Sittl, with the other examples deriving from medical texts, various ostraca and other non-traditional sources. Two sorts of regional features can be observed. The first are loanwords from a substrate language, such is the case with Britain. In African Latin, this substrate was Punic. African Romance included words such as ginga for "henbane", boba for "mallow," girba for "mortar" and gelela for the inner flesh of a gourd. The second refers to use of Latin words with particular meanings not found elsewhere, or in limited contexts. Of particular note is the African Romance use of the word rostrum for "mouth" instead of the original meaning in Latin, which is "beak", and baiae for "baths" being a late Latin and particularly African generalisation from the place-name Baiae. Pullus meaning "cock" or "rooster", was probably borrowed by Berber dialects from African Romance, for use instead of the Latin gallus. The originally abstract word dulcor is seen applied as a probable medical African specialisation relating to sweet wine instead of the Latin passum or mustum. The Latin for grape, traditionally indeterminate (acinis), male (acinus) or neuter (acinum), in various African Latin sources changes to the feminine acina. Other examples include the use of pala as a metaphor for the shoulder blade; centenarium, which only occurs in the Albertini Tablets and may have meant "granary"; and infantilisms such as dida, which apparently meant "breast/nipple" or "wet nurse".'

Both Africans, such as Augustine of Hippo and the grammarian Pompeius, as well as non-Africans, such as Consentius and Jerome, wrote on African features, some in very specific terms. Indeed in his De Ordine, dated to late 386, Augustine remarks how he was still criticised by the Italians for his pronunciation, while he himself often found fault with theirs.  While modern scholars may express doubts on the interpretation or accuracy of some of these writings, they contend that African Latin must have been distinctive enough to inspire so much discussion.

Extinction as a vernacular 

Prior to the Arab conquest in 696–705 AD, a Romance language was probably spoken alongside Berber languages in the region. Loanwords from Northwest African Romance to Berber are attested, usually in the accusative form: examples include atmun ("plough-beam") from temonem.

Following the conquest, it becomes difficult to trace the fate of African Romance. The Umayyad administration did at first utilize the local Latin language in coinage from Carthage and Kairouan in the early 7th century, displaying Latin inscriptions of Islamic phrases such as D[e]us tu[us] D[e]us et a[li]us non e[st] ("God is your God and there is no other"), a variation of the shahada, or Muslim declaration of faith. African Latin was soon replaced by Arabic as the primary administrative language, but it existed at least until the arrival of the Banu Hilal Arabs in the 11th century and probably until the beginning of the 14th century. It
likely continued to be widely spoken in various parts of the littoral of Africa into the 12th century, exerting a significant influence on Northwest African Arabic, particularly the language of northwestern Morocco.

Amongst the Berbers of Ifriqiya, African Romance was linked to Christianity, which survived in North Africa (outside of Egypt) until the 14th century. Spoken Latin or Romance is attested in Gabès by Ibn Khordadbeh; in Béja, Biskra, Tlemcen, and Niffis by al-Bakri; and in Gafsa and Monastir by al-Idrisi, who observes that the people in Gafsa "are Berberised, and most of them speak the African Latin tongue." There is also a possible reference to spoken Latin or African Romance in the 11th century, when the Rustamid governor Abu Ubayda Abd al-Hamid al-Jannawni was said to have sworn his oath of office in Arabic, Berber and in an unspecified "town language", which might be interpreted as a Romance variety; in the oath, the Arabic-rendered phrase bar diyyu could represent some variation of Latin per Deu(m) ("by God".)
In their quest to conquer the Kingdom of Africa in the 12th century, the Normans were aided by the remaining Christian population of Tunisia, who some linguists, among them , argue had been speaking a Romance language for centuries. 

The final attestations of African Romance come from the Renaissance period. The 15th century Italian humanist  makes the most significant remarks on the language and its features, reporting that a Catalan merchant named Riaria who had lived in North Africa for thirty years told him that the villagers in the Aurès mountain region "speak an almost intact Latin and, when Latin words are corrupted, then they pass to the sound and habits of the Sardinian language". The 16th century geographer and diplomat Leo Africanus, who was born into a Muslim family in Granada and fled the Reconquista to Morocco, also says that the North Africans retained their own language after the Islamic conquest which he calls "Italian", which must refer to Romance. A statement by Mawlâ Aḥmad is sometimes interpreted as implying the survival of a Christian community in Tozeur into the eighteenth century, but this is unlikely; Prevost estimates that Christianity disappeared around the middle of the thirteenth century in southern Tunisia.

Related languages

The Sardinian hypothesis 

The most prominent theory for the classification of African Romance (at least for the interior province of Africa Proconsularis) is that it belonged to a shared subgroup along with Sardinian, called Southern Romance by some linguists. This branch of Romance, of which Sardinian would today be the only surviving member, could have also been spoken in the medieval period in Corsica prior to the island's Tuscanization, southern Basilicata (eastern region of the Lausberg area) and perhaps other regions in southern Italy, Sicily and possibly even Malta.

A potential linguistic relationship between Sardinia and North Africa could have been built up as a result of the two regions' long pre-Roman cultural ties starting from the 8th-7th centuries BC, when the island fell under the Carthaginian sphere of influence. This resulted in the Punic language being spoken in Sardinia  up to the 3rd–4th centuries AD, and several Punic loan-words survive into modern Sardinian. Cicero also mocks Sardinia's perceived Carthaginian and African cultural identity as the source of its inferiority and disloyalty to Rome. The affinity between the two regions persisted after the collapse of the Western Roman Empire under shared governance by the Vandal Kingdom and then the Byzantine Exarchate of Africa. Pinelli believes that the Vandal presence had "estranged Sardinia from Europe, linking its own destiny to Africa's territorial expanse" in a bond that was to strengthen further "under Byzantine rule, not only because the Roman Empire included the island in the African Exarchate, but also because it developed from there, albeit indirectly, its ethnic community, causing it to acquire many of the African characteristics".

The spoken variety of African Romance was perceived to be similar to Sardinian as reported in the above-cited passage by  – supporting hypotheses that there were parallelisms between developments of Latin in Africa and Sardinia. Although this testimony comes from a secondhand source, the Catalan merchant Riaria, these observations are reliable since Sardinia was under Catalan rule by the Crown of Aragon, so the merchant could have had the opportunity to trade in both regions. 

Augustine of Hippo writes that "African ears have no quick perception of the shortness or length of [Latin] vowels". This also describes the evolution of vowels in the Sardinian language. Sardinian has only five vowels, and no diphthongs; unlike the other surviving Romance languages, the five long vowel pairs of Classical Latin, ā, ē, ī, ō, ū (phonetically [aː, eː, iː, oː, uː]), merged with their corresponding short vowel counterparts ă, ĕ, ĭ, ŏ, ŭ [a, ɛ, ɪ, ɔ, ʊ]  into five single vowels with no length distinction: /a, ɛ, i, ɔ, u/. In the Italo-Western Romance varieties, short ǐ, ŭ [ɪ, ʊ] merged with long ē, ō [e(ː), o(ː)] instead of with long ī, ū [i(ː), u(ː)] as in Sardinian, which typically resulted in a seven vowel system, for example /a, ɛ, e, i, ɔ, o, u/ in Italian.

Adams theorises that similarities in some vocabulary, such as pala ("shoulderblade") and acina ("grape") across Sardinian and African Romance, or spanu in Sardinian and spanus ("light red") in African Romance, may be evidence that some vocabulary was shared between Sardinia and Africa. A further theory suggests that the Sardinian word for "Friday", cenàpura or chenàpura (literally "pure dinner", in reference to parasceve, or Friday preparation for the Sabbath), may have been brought to Sardinia by North African Jews. The term cena pura is used by Augustine, although there is no evidence that its meaning in Africa extended beyond the Jewish religious context to simply refer to the day of Friday. It is additionally speculated that the Sardinian word for the month of June, lámpadas ("lamps"), could have a connection to African usage due to references by Fulgentius and in a work on the Nativity of John the Baptist to a lampadarum dies ("day of the lamps") during the harvest in June. Additionally, it is notable that Sardinian is the only Romance language in which the name for the Milky Way, meaning "the Way of Straw", also occurs in Berber languages, hinting at a possible African Romance connection. 

Blasco Ferrer suggests that the Latin demonstrative ipse/-a, from which derive both the Sardinian definite article su/sa as well as the subject personal pronouns , could have exerted influence on the Berber feminine prefix ta, especially in its alternative forms θa, possibly via an intermediate form *tsa. Apart from Sardinian, the only other Romance varieties which take their article from ipse/-a (instead of ille/-a) are the Catalan dialects of the Balearic islands and certain areas of Girona, the Vall de Gallerina and tàrbena, as well as medieval Gascon. However, the connection between ipsa and ta remains highly speculative and without concrete evidence. 

Muhammad al-Idrisi additionally observes cultural similarities between Sardinians and Roman Africans, saying that "the Sardinians are ethnically Roman Africans, live like the Berbers, shun any other nation of Rûm; these people are courageous and valiant, that never part with their weapons."

Other theories: Eastern Romance and Hispano-Romance 

More recent research could point towards an alternate development for the Latin spoken in the province of Mauretania in western North Africa. Although agreeing with previous studies that the Late Latin of the interior province of Africa Proconsularis certainly displayed Sardinian vocalism, Adamik argues based on inscriptional evidence that the vowel system was not uniform across the entirety of the North African coast, and there is some indication that the Latin variety of Mauretania Caesariensis was possibly changing in the direction of the asymmetric six-vowel system found in Eastern Romance languages such as Romanian: /a, ɛ, e, i, o, u/. In Eastern Romance, on the front vowel axis short ǐ [ɪ] merged with long ē [e(ː)] as /e/ while keeping short ĕ /ɛ/ as a separate phoneme (as in Italo-Western Romance), and on the back vowel axis short ŭ [ʊ] merged with long ū [u(ː)], while short ŏ [ɔ] merged with long ō [o(ː)] as /o/ (similar to in Sardinian.)

Due to the vast size of Roman territory in Africa, it is indeed plausible (if not likely) based on the analysis above that multiple distinct Romance languages had evolved there from Latin, perhaps separating along provincial lines between a Mauretanian Romance variety spoken in the western regions and an "Afro-Sardinian" or "Afro-Insular" Romance group spoken in central North Africa and the Mediterranean islands. 

Some scholars also theorise that many of the North African invaders of Hispania in the Early Middle Ages spoke some form of African Romance, with "phonetic, morphosyntactic, lexical and semantic data" from African Romance appearing to have contributed in the development of Ibero-Romance." It is suggested that African Latin betacism may have pushed the phonological development of Ibero-Romance varieties in favor of the now characteristic Spanish b/v merger as well as influencing the lengthening of stressed short vowels (after the loss of vowel length distinction) evidenced in lack of diphthongization of short e/o in certain words (such as teneo > tengo ("I have"), pectus > pecho ("chest"), mons > monte ("mountain".) In the area of vocabulary, it is possible that the meaning of rostrum (originally "bird beak") may have changed to mean "face" (of humans or animals), as in Spanish rostro, under the influence of African usage, and the African Latin-exclusive word centenarium ("granary") may have yielded the names of two towns in Huesca called Centenero. Adamik also finds evidence for dialectological similarity between Hispania and Africa based on rates of errors in the case system, a relation which could have increased from the 4th-6th centuries AD but was disrupted by the Islamic invasion.

Berber and Maghrebi Arabic 

Scholars including Brugnatelli and Kossmann have identified at least 40 words in various Berber dialects which are certain to have been loans from Latin or African Romance. For example, in Ghadames the word "äng'alus" refers to a spiritual entity, clearly using a word from the Latin  "angel". A complete list of Latin/Romance loanwords is provided below under the section on Berber vocabulary. 

Some impacts of African Romance on Maghrebi Arabic are also theorised. For example, in calendar month names, the word furar "February" is only found in the Maghreb and in the Maltese language – proving the word's ancient origins. The region also has a form of another Latin named month in awi/ussu < augustus. This word does not appear to be a loan word through Arabic, and may have been taken over directly from Late Latin or African Romance. Scholars theorise that a Latin-based system provided forms such as awi/ussu and furar, with the system then mediating Latin/Romance names through Arabic for some month names during the Islamic period. The same situation exists for Maltese which mediated words from Italian, and retains both non-Italian forms such as awissu/awwissu and frar, and Italian forms such as april.

Characteristics

Starting from African Romance's similarity with Sardinian, scholars theorise that the similarity may be pinned down to specific phonological properties. Sardinian lacks palatization of velar stops before front vowels, and features the pairwise merger of short and long non-low vowels. Evidence is found that both isoglosses were present in African Latin (at least in the central province of Africa Proconsularis):  
 Velar stops also remain unaffected in Latin loanwords in Berber. For example, tkilsit  ("mulberry tree") < (morus) celsa in Latin, and i-kīkər ("chickpea") < cicer in Latin, or ig(e)r , ("field") < ager in Latin.
Thus, there are forms such as dikite ("say", 2nd person plural imperative), iaket ("he/she lies down"), dekember ("December") and pake ("peace") with  such as dilektus ("beloved"), karus ("dear") and Afrikana ("African"), found in an inscriptional corpus.
 Some evidence that Latin words with a "v" are often written with a "b" in African Romance, as reported by Isidore of Seville: birtus ("virtue") < virtus in Latin, boluntas ("will") < voluntas, and bita ("life") < vita. Adams and Adamik both observe frequent b/v confusions in inscriptions and non-literary documents from Africa Proconsularis. On the other hand, according to Adamik Mauretania Caesariensis shows a much lower rate of betacism, comparable to Hispania or Gaul.
The 5th century Albertini Tablets suggest high levels of phonetic errors and an uncertainty in the use of Latin cases. 
In a study of errors on stressed vowels in a corpus of 279 inscriptions, scholars noted how African inscriptions confused between over-stressed and under-stressed vowels between the 1st and 4th century AD, with Rome reaching comparable error rates only by the late 4th to 6th centuries.
As aforementioned, there is strong evidence that the Latin/Romance of Africa Proconsularis shared an identical five-vowel system (probably /a, ɛ, i, ɔ, u/) with Sardinian. Augustine of Hippo's testimony on how ōs ("mouth") in Latin was to African ears indistinguishable from ŏs ("bone") indicates the merger of vowels and the loss of the original allophonic quality distinction in vowels. 
 Analysis of inscriptions and non-literary documents, including the 3rd century Bu Njem ostraca and Albertini Tablets demonstrate that, despite the presence of other common Vulgar Latin sound changes (such as loss of aspirate h, monophthongization of ae and loss of final m), confusion between ē and ǐ and ō and ŭ is almost nonexistent. Adams finds that inscriptions display a rate of ē/ǐ and ō/ŭ mistakes of only 0.7%, while in the Bu Njem ostraca ē/ǐ and ō/ŭ confusion is totally absent and in the Albertini Tablets there are fewer than two of each error. In contrast, by the 6th-7th c. inscriptions from Gaul show that misspellings of ē/ǐ had come to surpass instances of correct spellings, with an error rate of 51% Data by Adamik shows very slightly higher rates of confusion in Africa Proconsularis (5.3%), but still far lower than in Gaul (63.5%) or Hispania (21.3%), and he similarly concludes that "the later Latin of Africa Proconsularis undoubtedly belonged to the Sardinian Romance type of vocalism."
 In Latin loanwords in Berber, Latin short ĭ, ŭ also result in i, u (instead of e, o) as in Sardinian. For example, pullus ("chicken") > afullus, cicer ("chickpea") > i-kīkər, pirus ("pear tree") > ti-firest. However, as Adams points out, assumptions about African Romance vocalism based solely on loanwords should be taken with caution due to the lack of vowels /e, o/ in Berber languages. 
On the contrary, Adamik states that data from inscriptions show that the vowel system of the western province of Mauretania Caesariensis seemed to be developing differently from that of Africa Proconsularis/Sardinia. Due to a higher number of ē/ǐ confusions found than ō/ŭ confusions (at 4.6% vs. 1.3%), it is suggested that the vocalic system of Mauretanian Latin might possibly "have started to develop toward the eastern or Balkan (more exactly Rumanian) type of vocalism": e.g., merging ē with ĭ, ĭ with ī and ŭ with ū, potentially resulting in the six-vowel system /a, ɛ, e, i, o, u/. However, spelling error rates are still too low for a definite conclusion to be made on the classification of the dialect of Mauretania Caesariensis.
 There is additional evidence both from commentary and metrical inscriptions for confusion over syllable length and stress resulting from the collapse of vowel length distinctions. In another passage, Augustine writes that a sound change which was criticized by grammarians was to lengthen formerly short stressed vowels in words like cano ("to sing'), e.g. as [ˈkaːnɔ] instead of [ˈkanoː]. Consentius makes a similar remark that Africans tended to mispronounce piper ("pepper") with the formerly short stressed syllable lengthened, e.g. [ˈpiːpɛr] instead of [ˈpɪpɛr], while also shortening formerly long unstressed syllables, as in orator with short o, e.g. [ɔˈraːtɔr] instead of [oːraːtɔr]. 
 Herman also finds evidence metrical inscriptions from the 1st-4th centuries AD for the lengthening of short stressed vowels and shortening of long unstressed vowels, which could point to an earlier loss of contrastive vowel length than in Rome. Adams' analysis of 3rd century poems from Bu Njem written by Italian and African soldiers seem to reflect a dialectal contrast in the vowel systems of the two regions, with the Italian Avidius writer preserving Classical prosody and the African Iasucthan displaying vowel length distinction loss (given that Iasucthan is assumed to have been a native Latin speaker.)

 Berber vocabulary 
The Polish Arabist  tried to reconstruct some sections of this language based on 85 lemmas mainly derived from Northwest African toponyms and anthroponyms found in medieval sources. Due to the historical presence in the region of Classical Latin, modern Romance languages, as well as the influence of the Mediterranean Lingua Franca (that has Romance vocabulary) it is difficult to differentiate the precise origin of words in Berber languages and in the varieties of Maghrebi Arabic. The studies are also difficult and often highly conjectural. Due to the large size of the North African territory, it is highly probable that not one but several varieties of African Romance existed, much like the wide variety of Romance languages in Europe. Moroever, other Romance languages spoken in Northwest Africa before the European colonization were the Mediterranean Lingua Franca, a pidgin with Arabic and Romance influences, and Judaeo-Spanish, a dialect of Spanish brought by Sephardi Jews. Scholars are uncertain or disagree on the Latin origin of some of the words presented in the list, which may be attributed alternatively to Berber language internal etymology.

Scholars believe that there is a great number of Berber words, existing in various dialects, which are theorised to derive from late Latin or African Romance, such as the vocabulary in the following list. It might be possible to reconstruct a chronology of which loans entered Berber languages in the Classical Latin period versus in Late Latin/Proto-Romance based on features; for example, certain forms such as afullus (from pullus, "chicken") or asnus (< asinus, "donkey") preserve the Classical Latin nominative ending -us, whereas other words like abekkadu (< peccatum, "sin") or muṛu (< murus, "wall") have lost final -s (matching parallel developments in Romance.) Forms such as tayda (< taeda, "pinewood"), which seem to preserve the Latin diphthong ae, might also be interpreted as archaic highly conservative loans from the Roman Imperial period or earlier. 

However, the potential chronological distinction based on word endings is inconsistent; the form qaṭṭus (from cattus, "cat") preserves final -s, but cattus is only attested in Late Latin, when one would expect final -s to have been dropped. Further, the -u endings may instead simply derive from accusative forms which had lost final -m; as a comparison, words drawn from 3rd declension nouns may vary between nominative-based forms like falku < falco ("falcon"), and accusative/oblique-case forms like atmun < temo  (Acc: temonem, "pole", c.f. Italian timone) or amerkidu ("divine recompense") < merces (Acc: mercedem, "pay/wages", c.f. Italiian mercede.)

Nevertheless, when undisputed Latin-derived Berber words are compared with corresponding terms in Italian, Sardinian, Corsican, Sicilian and Maltese, shared phonological outcomes with Sardinian (and to some extent Corsican) seem apparent. For evidence of the merger of Latin short ǐ, ŭ [ɪ, ʊ] with /i, u/  instead of /e, o/, compare how Latin pirus/a ("pear tree/pear") results in Berber ifires and Sardinian pira vs. Italian pero, and Latin pullus ("chicken") becomes Berber afullus and Sardinian puddu vs. Italian pollo. For the lack of palatalization of velar stops, notice how Latin merces ("pay/wages") results in Berber amerkidu and Sardinian merchede vs. Italian mercede, and Latin cicer ("chickpea") becomes Berber ikiker and Sardinian chìghere vs. Italian cece. 

For the other month names, see Berber calendar.

See also

 Africitas'', a purported "style" of African Latin. 
 Southern Romance, a proposed hypothetical Romance classification, including Sardinian and African Romance
 Lausberg area, a region of southern Italy covering Basilicata where the local Neapolitan dialects display variation between Sardinian, Sicilian and Romanian-like vowel systems
 Sardinian language, as stated above, theorized to be the closest surviving language to African Romance. 
 British Latin, another extinct dialect of Latin.
 Moselle Romance, another extinct dialect of Latin.
 Pannonian Romance, another extinct dialect of Latin.

Notes

References

Citations

Sources

Primary sources

Secondary sources

Further reading 
 

Extinct Romance languages
Romance languages in Africa
Languages of Algeria
Languages of Tunisia
Languages attested from the 1st millennium
Languages extinct in the 1st millennium
Africa (Roman province)